The Prophet Jonah is one of the seven Old Testament prophets painted by the Italian High Renaissance master Michelangelo (c. 1542–1545) on the Sistine Chapel ceiling. The Sistine Chapel is in Vatican Palace, in the Vatican City.

This particular fresco is painted above the High Altar, as the person of Jonah is of prophetic significance in Christianity. Behind the figure of Jonah, Michelangelo has painted a large fish (Tarpon), a reference to the fact that in the Book of Jonah, Jonah is swallowed by one.

Sistine Chapel ceiling
Jonah
Fish in art
Paintings depicting Hebrew Bible prophets